NFDA may refer to:

 National Food and Drug Authority, a licensing and regulatory agency in Uganda 
 National Franchised Dealers Association
 N-substituted formamide deformylase, an enzyme